Skylab VII is the seventh studio album by the Brazilian musician Rogério Skylab, the seventh in his series of ten eponymous, numbered albums. It was self-released in 2007, and counted with guest appearances by musicians Maurício Pereira (vocalist and saxophonist of the duo Os Mulheres Negras), Zé Felipe and Marlos Salustiano (bassist and keyboardist for now-defunct avant-garde band Zumbi do Mato, respectively), who co-wrote some of the tracks alongside Skylab.

Skylab and Zé Felipe would come up with the collaborative output Rogério Skylab & Orquestra Zé Felipe two years later.

The album can be downloaded for free on Skylab's official website.

Critical reception
Writing for Scream & Yell, Marcelo Costa gave the album a positive review of 8.5 out of 10, particularly praising the tracks "Qual Foi o Lucro Obtido?", "Dá um Beijo na Boca Dele", "A Irmã da Minha Mulher", "O Primeiro Tapa É Meu" and "Ei, Moço, Já Matou uma Velhinha Hoje?". He also jokingly stated that "in comparison, Skylab makes Marilyn Manson look like Junior Lima".

The album was nominated to the Prêmio Dynamite de Música Independente, in the "Best Rock Album" category, in 2008, but lost to Cachorro Grande's Todos os Tempos. Website La Cumbuca included Skylab VII in 110th place in its list of the Top 200 Brazilian Albums of the 2000s; Skylab II, IV and V were also featured on the list, in 24th, 42nd and 71st place, respectively.

Track listing

Personnel
 Rogério Skylab – vocals, production
 Maurício Pereira – additional vocals, saxophone (track 18)
 Alex Curi – bass guitar
 Alexandre Guichard – classical guitar
 Bruno Coelho – drums
 Thiago Amorim – electric guitar
 Vânius Marques – mixing
 Luiz Tornaghi – mastering
 Solange Venturi – photography
 Carlos Mancuso – cover art

References

2007 albums
Rogério Skylab albums
Self-released albums
Sequel albums
Obscenity controversies in music
Albums free for download by copyright owner